Stygne (Ancient Greek: Στύγνη means "hated, abhorred"), in Greek mythology, was one of the Danaïdes, daughter of Danaus and Polyxo. She married (and murdered) Polyctor, son of Aegyptus and Caliadne.

Note

Danaids
Princesses in Greek mythology

Reference 

 Apollodorus, The Library with an English Translation by Sir James George Frazer, F.B.A., F.R.S. in 2 Volumes, Cambridge, MA, Harvard University Press; London, William Heinemann Ltd. 1921. ISBN 0-674-99135-4. Online version at the Perseus Digital Library. Greek text available from the same website.